The Bennett Lake Volcanic Complex (BLVC) is a huge 50-million-year-old extinct caldera complex that spans across the British Columbia-Yukon border in Canada. It is located near the western end of the West Arm of Bennett Lake. The caldera complex is surrounded by granitic rocks containing pendants.

It is located near the eastern contact of the Coast Plutonic Complex and the Whitehorse Trough. There are thick series of pyroclastic and epiclastic rocks at the caldera. Remnants of this huge caldera complex are preserved near Bennett Lake in the Coast Mountains. The complex compose the Skukum Group.

Formation and eruptive history
The Bennett Lake Volcanic Complex was formed when the ancient Kula Plate was subducting under North America during the early Eocene period. Volcanism continued for some time after the caldera collapse. High level andesite and rhyolite dikes and intrusive bodies crosscut volcanic flows and tuffs at all levels. Dike swarms are emplaced along ring fractures and fault zones at the southwest edge of the caldera.

See also
List of known large volcanic eruptions
List of volcanoes in Canada
Timeline of volcanism on Earth
Volcanism of Canada
Volcanism of Northern Canada
Volcanism of Western Canada

References

Calderas of British Columbia
Calderas of Yukon
Complex volcanoes
VEI-7 volcanoes
Subduction volcanoes
Atlin District
Eocene calderas
Polygenetic volcanoes